Virginia's 99th House of Delegates district elects one of the 100 members of the Virginia House of Delegates, the lower house of the state's bicameral legislature. The district is made up of the counties of King George, Lancaster, Northumberland, Richmond, Westmoreland, and part of Caroline County. Other than King George, the combined area is called the Northern Neck of Virginia.

The 99th district has been represented by Republican Margaret Ransone since 2012.

List of delegates

References

External links
 

Virginia House of Delegates districts
King George County, Virginia
Lancaster County, Virginia
Northumberland County, Virginia
Richmond County, Virginia
Westmoreland County, Virginia
Caroline County, Virginia